The Tomb of Ān Jiā, also sometimes read Ān Qié, is a Northern Zhou period (557-581 CE) funeral monument to a Sogdian nobleman named "An Jia" in the Chinese epitaph. The tomb was excavated in the city of Xi'an. It is now located in the collections of the Shaanxi Provincial Institute of Archaeology. An Jia died in the founding year of the Daxiang era (579 CE), during the reign of Emperor Jing.

The tomb
The tomb was composed of a stone gate and a stone couch located at the bottom of a ramped passageway, a structure which is typical of tombs built for Chinese nobility. The stone gate is decorated by two lions and an horizontal tablet where a Zoroastrian  sacrificial scene is depicted. This stone couch is composed of 11 stone blocks, decorated with a total of 56 pictures. These pictures are not Chinese in style, and show vivid scenes from the life of Anjia: out-going, feast, hunting, and entertainment.

The tomb was undisturbed and excavated intact in 2001, and was designated as one of the top ten archeological discoveries of that year. Other famous Chinese Sogdian tombs of the period are the Tomb of Yu Hong and the Tomb of Wirkak.

The Sogdian An Jia (518-579 CE)

An Jia (518-579 CE, died at the age of 62) was from a Sogdian noble family from Bukhara. According to his epitaph, he was the son of An Tujian, a governor of Mei Prefecture in Sichuan, and Lady Du of Changsong (a former county in Wuwei, Gansu). He was in charge of commercial affairs for foreign merchants from Middle Asia doing businesses in China, as well as Zoroastrian affairs, for the Tong Prefecture of the Northern Zhou dynasty. He held the official Chinese title "Sàbǎo" ("Protector, Guardian", derived from the Sogdian word , "caravan leader"), used for government-appointed leaders of the Sogdian immigrant-merchant community. Anjia was based in Xi'an, and was buried there.

Sogdian tombs in China are among the most lavish of the period in this country, and are only slightly inferior to Imperial tombs, suggesting that the Sogdian  were among the wealthiest members of the population.

Ethnographical aspects
The depictions in the tomb show the omnipresence of the Turks (at the time of the First Turkic Khaganate), who were probably the main trading partners of the Sogdian An Jia. The Hephthalites are essentially absent, or possibly showed once as a vassal ruler outside of the yurt of the Turk Qaghan, as they probably had been replaced by Turk hegemony by that time (they were destroyed by the alliance of the Sasanians and the Turks between 556 and 560 CE). In contrast, the Hephthalites are omnipresent in the Tomb of Wirkak, who, although he died at the same time of An Jia was much older at 85: Wirkak may therefore have primarily dealt with the Hephthalites during his younger years.

Epitaph
The epitaph of An Jia is as follows:

Text in traditional Chinese

Text in simplified Chinese

"Epitaph of An, Sabao and Grand Governor of Tong Prefecture. His first name was Jia, also called "Dajia", and came from Guzangchangsong..." |Epitaph of An Jia (translation upcoming)}}

Tomb decorations

See also
 Tomb of Li Dan

References

External links
 An Qie’s Funerary Bed

Buildings and structures completed in the 6th century
2001 archaeological discoveries
Archaeological discoveries in China
Northern Zhou
Tombs in China